Albatrellus cristatus is a species of fungus in the family Albatrellaceae. It is found in Asia, Europe, and North America, where it grows singly or in fused clumps on the ground in deciduous and coniferous forests. Fruit bodies contain cristatic acid, a benzoic acid derivative that has cytotoxic activity and antibiotic activity against Bacillus species  in laboratory tests. Another compound known only from the fungus, cristatomentin, is a green pigment with a meroterpene chemical structure.

References

External links
 

Russulales
Fungi described in 1774
Fungi of Asia
Fungi of Europe
Fungi of North America
Taxa named by Jacob Christian Schäffer